Emily Perl Kingsley is an American writer who joined the Sesame Street team in 1970 and continued to write until her retirement in 2015.

Her son Jason Kingsley was born with Down syndrome in 1974. Her experiences with Jason inspired her to include people with disabilities into the Sesame Street cast, including Tarah Schaeffer, an actress who uses a wheelchair,  and even Jason himself. Jason's story was the topic of an hour-long NBC television special in 1977, titled "This Is My Son", and with co-author Mitchell Levitz, Jason wrote the book "Count Us In: Growing Up with Down Syndrome".

In 1987, Kingsley wrote "Welcome to Holland", a widely published and translated piece which compares the experience of someone finding out their child has a disability to having a trip to Italy rerouted to Holland. The same year a made-for-television movie she wrote Kids Like These, premiered on CBS. The film, about a middle-aged couple who have a son with Down syndrome, won numerous awards.

Kingsley has written over 20 children's books and two Sesame Street home video releases (Kids' Guide to Life: Learning to Share and Elmo Says Boo!). She has had written for other companies as well, and recently contributed to two Disney Interactive CD-ROMs.

She has won 23 Daytime Emmys through her work with Sesame Street, three EDIs and a Grand EDI from Easter Seals, and an award from the National Theatre of the Deaf.

Credits

Filmography

Bibliography 

Emily has won 22 Emmy Awards for her work as a writer of Sesame Street.

In October 2008, Emily received a special award from the U.S. Government Department of Health and Human Services in recognition of her groundbreaking work including individuals with disabilities on Sesame Street for 38 years.

See also 

"Welcome to Holland"

References

External links
 Journey of Hearts (archived link, January 11, 2006)
 Welcome to Holland
 Creative Parents interview

Living people
American children's writers
Year of birth missing (living people)
American television writers
Daytime Emmy Award winners
American women children's writers
20th-century American women writers
American women television writers
21st-century American women